Novotroitske is an urban-type settlement in Volnovakha Raion (district) in Donetsk Oblast, at 34.4 km SW from the center of Donetsk city. Population:

History
The settlement was founded in the first half of the 19th century.

As of 15 February 2022, nine days prior to the 2022 Russian invasion of Ukraine, the settlement was under Ukrainian control. By 13 March, Russian state media released footage which it claimed showed that the settlement was under the control of the Donetsk People's Republic.

References

External links
 Weather forecast for Novotroitske

Urban-type settlements in Volnovakha Raion